Cuba Township is a township in Lake County, Illinois, USA.  As of the 2010 census, its population was 16,826.  Cuba Township was originally named Troy Township, but was renamed to Cuba in support of the López Expedition of 1851, when it was discovered the township name of Troy was already taken.

Geography
Lakes in this township include Davlins Pond, Grassy Lake, Honey Lake, Lake Barrington, Flint Lake, Lake Sheree and North Tower Lake. The stream of Flint Creek runs through this township.

Cities and towns
 Barrington Hills (northeast edge)
 Barrington (northwest quarter)
 Deer Park (west edge)
 Fox River Grove (east edge)
 Fox River Valley Gardens (southeast quarter)
 Lake Barrington (vast majority)
 North Barrington (west three-quarters)
 Tower Lakes

Adjacent townships
 Wauconda Township (north)
 Fremont Township (northeast)
 Ela Township (east)
 Palatine Township, Cook County (southeast)
 Barrington Township, Cook County (south)
 Algonquin Township, McHenry County (west)
 Nunda Township, McHenry County (northwest)

Cemeteries
The township contains two cemeteries: Saint Paul and White.

Major highways
 U.S. Route 14
 Illinois State Route 22
 Illinois State Route 59

Airports and landing strips
 Freier Airport is no longer in existence. It was located near Kelsey and Old Barrington Road and consisted of one grass runway.  It was created by Art Freier an American Airlines pilot and farmer.  Rumor has it he frequently flew to work from his home airport.  What is true is that he gave many of the youth in the area their first airplane ride in the 1960s.

Art as of 2013 is still living in the area

Demographics

References
 U.S. Board on Geographic Names (GNIS)
 United States Census Bureau cartographic boundary files

External links
 Cuba Township official website
 US-Counties.com
 City-Data.com
 US Census
 Illinois State Archives
 The Kentucky Regiment That Invaded Cuba in 1850

Townships in Lake County, Illinois
Townships in Illinois